Cole County is located in the central part of the U.S. state of Missouri. As of the 2020 census, its population was 77,279. Its county seat and largest city is Jefferson City, the state capital. The county was organized November 16, 1820 and named after pioneer William Temple Cole who built Cole's Fort in Boonville.

Cole County is in the Jefferson City, MO Metropolitan Statistical Area. It is south of the Missouri River.

In 2010, the center of the population of Missouri was in Cole County, near the village of Wardsville.

Geography
It is the third-smallest county in Missouri by area.

Adjacent counties
Boone County  (north)
Callaway County  (northeast)
Osage County  (southeast)
Miller County  (southwest)
Moniteau County  (northwest)

Major highways
 U.S. Route 50
 U.S. Route 54
 U.S. Route 63
 Route 17
 Route 179

Demographics

As of the census of 2000, there were 71,397 people, 27,040 households, and 17,927 families residing in the county.  The population density was 182 people per square mile (70/km2).  There were 28,915 housing units at an average density of 74 per square mile (29/km2).  The racial makeup of the county was 87.06% White, 9.92% Black or African American, 0.33% Native American, 0.88% Asian, 0.04% Pacific Islander, 0.54% from other races, and 1.23% from two or more races. Approximately 1.28% of the population were Hispanic or Latino of any race. 40.1% were of German, 13.6% American, 7.8% English and 6.9% Irish ancestry.

There were 27,040 households, out of which 33.60% had children under the age of 18 living with them, 53.00% were married couples living together, 10.00% had a female householder with no husband present, and 33.70% were non-families. 28.70% of all households were made up of individuals, and 9.30% had someone living alone who was 65 years of age or older.  The average household size was 2.43 and the average family size was 3.00.

In the county, the population was spread out, with 24.20% under the age of 18, 9.80% from 18 to 24, 32.30% from 25 to 44, 22.40% from 45 to 64, and 11.30% who were 65 years of age or older.  The median age was 36 years. For every 100 females, there were 105.60 males.  For every 100 females age 18 and over, there were 106.50 males.

The median income for a household in the county was $42,924, and the median income for a family was $53,416. Males had a median income of $33,769 versus $25,189 for females. The per capita income for the county was $20,739.  About 5.80% of families and 8.70% of the population were below the poverty line, including 11.50% of those under age 18 and 7.30% of those age 65 or over.

2020 Census

Government and infrastructure
The Missouri Department of Corrections (MDOC) operates the Jefferson City Correctional Center in Jefferson City. The current JCCC was opened on September 15, 2004, replacing the Missouri State Penitentiary in Jefferson City.

Education

Public schools
Blair Oaks R-II School District – Jefferson City 
Blair Oaks Elementary School (K-04) 
Blair Oaks Middle School (05-08) 
Blair Oaks High School (09-12)
Cole County R-I School District – Russellville
Cole County R-I Elementary School (PK-05) 
Cole County R-I Middle School (06-08) 
Russellville High School (09-12)
Cole County R-V School District – Eugene 
Eugene Elementary School (PK-06) 
Eugene High School (07-12)
Jefferson City Public School District – Jefferson City 
Southwest Early Childhood Education Center (PK) 
Southwest Elementary School (K-05) 
Callaway Hills Elementary School (K-05) – Holts Summit
South Elementary School (K-05) 
Thorpe J. Gordon Elementary School (K-05) 
East Elementary School (K-05) 
North Elementary School (K-05) – Holts Summit
Cedar Hill Elementary School (K-05) 
West Elementary School (K-05) 
Moreau Heights Elementary School (K-05) 
Belair Elementary School (K-05) 
Pioneer Trail Elementary School (K-05) 
Clarence Lawson Elementary School (PK-05) 
Thomas Jefferson Middle School (06-08)
Lewis & Clark Middle School (06-08) 
Jefferson City High School (09-12)
Capital City High School (09-12)

Private schools
Central Baptist Christian Academy – Jefferson City (K-12) – Baptist (Emphasis on Special Education)
Concord Christian School – Jefferson City (K-06) – Baptist
Immaculate Conception School – Jefferson City (K-09) – Roman Catholic
Immanuel Lutheran School – Jefferson City (K-09) – Lutheran
Kids in Montessori School – Jefferson City (K-02) – Nonsectarian
Lighthouse Preparatory Academy – Jefferson City (06-12) – Nonsectarian
Moreau Montessori School – Jefferson City (PK-05) – Nonsectarian
St. Francis Xavier School – Taos (K-09) – Roman Catholic
St. Joseph Cathedral School – Jefferson City (PK-08) – Roman Catholic
St. Martin School – St. Martins (K-09) – Roman Catholic
St. Peter Interparish School – Jefferson City (K-09) – Roman Catholic
St. Stanislaus Catholic School – Wardsville (K-09) – Roman Catholic
Trinity Lutheran School – Jefferson City (PK-09) – Lutheran
St. Thomas The Apostle School – Saint Thomas (K-09) – Roman Catholic
Calvary Lutheran High School – Jefferson City (09-12) – Lutheran
Helias Catholic High School – Jefferson City (09-12) – Roman Catholic

Post-secondary education
Lincoln University – Jefferson City – A public, four-year historically black university.

Public libraries
Missouri River Regional Library

Politics

Local
The Republican Party controls politics at the local level in Cole County. Republicans hold all but one of the elected positions in the county. The Democratic Party do not hold any elected positions on the county level.

State

Cole County is divided into five legislative districts in the Missouri House of Representatives, all of which elected Republicans.

District 49 — Travis Fitzwater (R-Holts Summit).  Consists of a small unincorporated area of the county just west of the city of Jefferson City.

District 50 — Sara Walsh.  Consists of unincorporated areas in the northwest corner of the county.

District 59 — Rudy Veit (R-Jefferson City).  Consists of the communities of Centertown, Eugene, Lohman, Russellville, St. Martins, Taos, and Wardsville.

District 60 — Dave Griffith (R-Jefferson City) Consists of the city of Jefferson City.

District 62 — Tom Hurst (R-Meta) Consists of the community of St. Thomas.

Cole County is a part of Missouri's 6th District in the Missouri Senate and is currently represented by Mike Bernskoetter (R-Jefferson City).

Federal

All of Cole County is included in Missouri's 3rd congressional district and is currently represented by Blaine Luetkemeyer (R-Saint Elizabeth) in the U.S. House of Representatives.

Political culture

Missouri presidential preference primary (2008)

Former U.S. Senator and President Barack Obama (D-Illinois) received more votes, a total of 4,642, than any candidate from either party in Cole County during the 2008 presidential primary. Cole County was one of only six counties (including the independent city of St. Louis) that backed Obama in Missouri.

Communities

Cities
Jefferson City (county seat and state capital; a small portion extends into Callaway County)
Lohman
Russellville
St. Martins
St. Thomas
Taos

Villages
Centertown
Wardsville

Unincorporated communities

 Apache Flats
 Bass
 Brazito
 Elston
 Eugene
 Henley
 Hickory Hill
 Honey Creek
 Marion
 Millbrook
 Osage Bend
 Osage Bluff
 Osage City
 Schubert
 Scott
 Scrivner
 Stringtown

See also

National Register of Historic Places listings in Cole County, Missouri

Education
School districts include:
 Blair Oaks R-II School District
 Cole County R-I School District
 Cole County R-V School District
 Jamestown C-1 School District
 Jefferson City Public Schools

References

Further reading
 History of Cole, Moniteau, Morgan, Benton, Miller, Maries and Osage counties, Missouri: from the earliest time to the present, including a department devoted to the preservation of sundry personal, business, professional and the private records; besides a valuable fund of notes, original observations, etc. etc. (1889) online

External links
Cole County government's website
Missouri River Regional Library
 Digitized 1930 Plat Book of Cole County  from University of Missouri Division of Special Collections, Archives, and Rare Books

 
1820 establishments in Missouri Territory
Populated places established in 1820
Missouri Rhineland
Jefferson City metropolitan area
Missouri counties on the Missouri River